Sam Rogers may refer to:

 Sam Rogers (linebacker) (born 1970), American football linebacker
 Sam Rogers (fullback) (born 1995), American football fullback
 Sam Rogers (soccer) (born 1999), American soccer player

See also
 Samuel Rogers (disambiguation)